Umar Farooq Ahmed (4 January 1979) is a former Danish cricketer. Farooq's batting style is unknown, but it is known he bowled slow left-arm orthodox.

Farooq first played for Denmark Under-19s against Ireland Under-19s in the 1995 International Youth Tournament in the Netherlands, making three appearances during the tournament. He later made five appearances in the 1997 International Youth Tournament in Bermuda, before being selected in Denmark's squad for the 1998 Under-19 World Cup, making his Youth One Day International (YODI) debut in the tournament against Ireland Under-19s. He made five further YODI appearances in that World Cup, the last of which came against Namibia Under-19s.

His senior debut for Denmark came in a friendly against the Marylebone Cricket Club in 2002 at Svanholm Park, Brøndby. In that same year, he played in the European Cricket Championship, making four appearances in the tournament. The following year, he played in what would be his only List A match, against Wales Minor Counties in the 1st round of English domestic cricket's 2004 Cheltenham & Gloucester Trophy, which was held in August 2003 to avoid fixture congestion early in the 2004 season. In the match, played at Pen-y-Pound, Abergavenny, Denmark won the toss and elected to bat first, making 189/8 from their 50 overs, with Farooq being dismissed for 12 runs by Matthew Mason. In Wales Minor Counties successful chase, Farooq bowled 10 wicketless overs, conceding 24 runs. Wales Minor Counties final margin of victory was by 7 wickets. His final appearances for Denmark came in September 2003, with two appearances against Ireland.

References

External links
Umar Farooq at ESPNcricinfo
Umar Farooq at CricketArchive

1979 births
Living people
Danish cricketers
Danish people of Pakistani descent